The 1996–97 Colonial Hockey League season was the sixth season of the Colonial Hockey League, a North American minor professional league. Ten teams participated in the regular season and the Quad City Mallards won the league title.

Regular season

Colonial Cup-Playoffs

External links
 Season 1996/97 on hockeydb.com

United Hockey League seasons
CHL
CHL